Metheny is an English surname, originated from the village name of Methley in Yorkshire.

People
 Bud Metheny (1915–2003), Major League Baseball player and college head coach
 C. Brainerd Metheny (1889–1960), American football and basketball coach, college athletics administrator, and insurance executive
 Joe Metheny (1955–2017), American serial killer and cannibal
 Kevin Metheny (1954–2014), American radio and cable network executive
 Linda Metheny (born 1947), American artistic gymnast
 Mike Metheny (born 1949), American jazz flugelhornist and music journalist
 Pat Metheny (born 1954), American jazz guitarist and composer, brother of Mike Metheny

See also
Matheny (disambiguation)